Sky Sports F1 is a television channel created exclusively for Sky's UK and Ireland coverage of Formula One, with Sky having a package of rights from the 2012 season to the 2029 season. From 2012 to 2029, Sky Sports F1 has the exclusive rights to broadcast Formula 1 live in the UK and Ireland, and will sub-licence highlights of all races and qualifying sessions plus the British Grand Prix live to Channel 4. Since 2017, Sky Sports F1 has broadcast Formula 1 in 4K UHD.

Background
The BBC had exclusive UK F1 rights from 2009 until the end of the 2013 season, having regained the rights from ITV. However, a new broadcast rights deal was announced on 29 July 2011, stating that Sky Sports would cover all races live. The BBC continued to broadcast half of the races live including the British Grand Prix and final race. It also allowed the BBC to show highlights of all races. In November 2011, Sky announced the new dedicated F1 channel would launch in March 2012, and will air all F1 races with coverage of practice sessions, qualifying and the race, live and commercial-free.

On 21 December 2015, it was announced that the BBC would be ending its broadcast rights three seasons early after the 2015 season with its rights to 10 live races and highlights of all 21 races going to Channel 4. However, BBC Radio 5 Live and BBC Radio 5 Live Sports Extra would continue to broadcast live commentary of the whole season until the 2021 season.

Prior to the launch of the channel, there was some controversy about switching Formula One coverage at least in part to pay television. However, since its launch, similar channels have launched in Germany and Italy in further moves towards a pay TV/free-to-air coverage mix by FOM (the Formula 1 rights holder).

Launch

The channel launched on 9 March 2012, seven days before the start of the 2012 Formula One season. During 2012, the channel was on air for sixty-three hours during race weeks and thirty-two hours during non-race weeks. Sky Sports F1 announced via Twitter that there would not be a dedicated Sky Sports F1 app, however the F1 section on the Sky Sports News app was enhanced.

Sky Sports F1 launched with a two-hour special of The F1 Show, presented by Simon Lazenby, Martin Brundle and Damon Hill, previewing the 2012 Formula One season.

Availability
Sky Sports F1 HD on the Sky platform was available to new and existing customers before 1 April 2013 providing they subscribed to the HD pack. Existing subscribers to all of the Sky Sports channels without the HD pack received a standard definition version. Virgin Media and Smallworld Cable offer the standard definition version of the channel to Sky Sports subscribers, it is not available separately. The HD version of the channel was made available to Virgin Media customers subscribing to the Sky Sports Collection with the additional Sky Sports HD pack on 15 July 2014. A standard definition version of the channel is also provided through Sky Go.

Since 18 July 2017, new Sky TV customers are able to purchase the channel as a standalone channel, or as part of a larger Sky Sports package.

International simulcasting 
Beginning at the 2016 Formula One season, Canadian F1 rights holder TSN began to simulcast Sky's coverage, including the pre- and post-race programmes and in-race commentary.

For the 2018 Formula One season, Formula One's new US rights holder ESPN similarly began using Sky Sports F1's commentary, along with a simulcast of the pre-race show and some of the post-race show if necessary. At least four races are also televised on ABC under the ESPN on ABC banner. However, after criticism over its handling and timing of adverts during the race coverage of the 2018 Australian Grand Prix (at times cutting off commentators mid-sentence), ESPN announced that it would broadcast the remaining races of the season with a single presenting sponsor, and no commercial interruptions. For the 2019 Formula One season, Welcome to the Weekend and Pit Lane Live also became available on the digital subscription service ESPN+.

Coverage

Formula One

The 2012 season started on 16 March (live practice) from the Melbourne Grand Prix Circuit, Australia. Sky Sports broadcast every practice session, qualifying session and race live. The season passed 19 countries on the way. Formula One visited places as diverse as China, Bahrain, Belgium, Italy, and also United States for a Grand Prix taking place in Austin, Texas at the brand new Circuit of the Americas. The season came to an end at the 2012 Brazilian Grand Prix on 25 November 2012.

On 7 March 2012, Sky Sports F1 revealed its theme tune for the 2012 season, "Just Drive" by Alistair Griffin, which has been re-recorded with the Prague Philharmonic Orchestra and Rodolfus Choir. The 43-second opening credits feature archive footage of former world champions and memorable F1 moments from 32 Grands Prix between 1950 and 2011. The theme tune is also used on The F1 Show and for Classic F1. 2014 saw a rearrangement of the theme to go with updated titles. Sky's original arrangement is still utilised for its coverage of Classic F1 races.

During the 2012 season, Santander UK was the official sponsor of Formula One coverage on Sky Sports F1 in a deal that was estimated to be worth £3 million. The coverage was sponsored by Shell in 2014. From the 2015 Malaysian Grand Prix, FairFX sponsored coverage on Sky Sports F1.

The season opening Australian Grand Prix, the first to be broadcast exclusively by Sky, had an average audience of 526,000 viewers between 4.30 am and 9 am on 18 March, with a five-minute peak of 1.02 million as Jenson Button won the race. The BBC's live coverage of the same race last season averaged 2.13 million viewers, a 51.1% share of the audience.

Sky Sports won "Best TV Broadcast Award for Outstanding Coverage" at both the 2012 FIA Prize Giving Ceremony (following Sky Sports F1's debut season presenting Formula One) and again in 2013.

Beginning 2019, Sky Sports holds exclusive rights to all races excluding the British Grand Prix. In September 2018, it was announced that Channel 4 had agreed to a sub-licensing agreement with Sky, under which it will broadcast free-to-air highlights of all races, and live coverage of the British Grand Prix. As a condition of the deal, Channel 4 agreed to give Sky the right to carry full series of its drama programming (including its curated foreign dramas collection Walter Presents) on its on-demand platforms.

In December 2021, with the season-long title contenders Max Verstappen and Lewis Hamilton tied on points after the Saudi Arabian Grand Prix, Sky Sports announced a partnership with Channel 4 to show live race day coverage from the title-deciding round in Abu Dhabi free-to-air.

Presentation and commentary team
The presentation team currently (as of January 2023) consists of:

Support races
In February 2012, it was announced that Sky Sports F1 would also broadcast the GP2 and GP3 series live. These series were eventually rebranded as the FIA Formula 2 Championship and the FIA Formula 3 Championship respectively
 Formula 2 – Formula 1's feeder series
 Formula 3 – Feeder series for Formula 2
 Porsche Supercup

Sky Sports takes the FOM-provided world feed commentary for Formula 2 and Formula 3. Commentators include Alex Jacques, Alex Brundle and Harry Benjamin. Previously, Jacques has been joined by 2012 GP2 champion Davide Valsecchi for F2 events. Johnny Herbert, Rosanna Tennant and Alice Powell have also previously reported or commentated on Formula 2 and Formula 3.

IndyCar
Sky Sports F1 aired the opening round of the 2012 IndyCar Series season. The IndyCar Series moved to BT Sport in 2013, but returned to Sky Sports F1 in 2019 under a new contract by Sky's new owner Comcast, which also holds the U.S. domestic rights to the series. Sky Sports F1 has shown live every race in the Indycar calendar since 2019, with a combination of original American broadcast commentary and additional own commentary.

Programming
The F1 Show;
The first programme to air on Sky Sports F1 was its weekly magazine show; The F1 Show. Initially presented by Georgie Thompson and Ted Kravitz (apart from the launch show, which was presented by Simon Lazenby), then by Kravitz and Natalie Pinkham, as of the 2014 season, it is presented by Natalie Pinkham or Rachel Brookes with contributions from David Croft, Paul di Resta/Anthony Davidson, Johnny Herbert/Damon Hill. The programme has not featured in the 2020 schedule.

The F1 Show returned for the 2021 season, replacing F1 Report, broadcast live on Sky Sports F1 and YouTube. It is presented by members of the coverage team at the track, usually fronted by Natalie Pinkham or Rachel Brookes. It features interviews with drivers, analysis and challenges. In 2021, it was broadcast on Thursday evening but moved to Friday evening after Formula 1 rescheduled it's weekend layout.

F1 Report;
Presented by Natalie Pinkham or Rachel Brookes and regular analyst Marc Priestley.
In the week before or after a race, the programme looks in further depth at some of the stories and incidents that featured or may feature in race weekends. This series has been replaced by Welcome to the Weekend, a Thursday race weekend show with a similar format. It no longer features Marc Priestley.

Welcome to the Weekend, from the start of the 2020 season, was broadcast directly before the First Practice session on Fridays. The programme did not feature in the 2021 schedule, replaced by a relaunched The F1 Show.

Classic F1;
Coverage of an F1 race from the archive corresponding to the current race that weekend.

Ted's Notebook;
A topical show presented by Ted Kravitz. It was retitled The Notebook for 2020 and followed the race programme on Sunday only. Since 2021, it has followed most qualifying and race programmes, and is sometimes referred to as Ted's Notebook on the EPG and when uploaded onto YouTube in the evening after being aired.

Features
Sky Sports have a device called the 'Sky Pad', used by Anthony Davidson, Karun Chandhok and Ted Kravitz and others. It is used to show highlights.

Sky Sports News
During the Formula One season, Sky Sports News has two pit-lane reporters; Rachel Brookes and Craig Slater. They provide exclusive content to Sky Sports News viewers on the latest Formula One news. Brookes role has increased to include presenting some editions of the F1 Show, an alternate driver interviewer (in addition to Natalie Pinkham), and lead presenter for the Russian Grand Prix 2020.

Sky Race Control
Sky Race Control is the brand name used across all of Sky Sports F1's interactive services. Sky Race Control is available via the red button as well as the Sky Sports website and iPad app in conjunction with a Sky ID. Features include the race coverage, official Formula One timing showing times of all 20 drivers in every session and 3 selective onboard camera feeds alternating between certain drivers. Sky Race Control has been scrapped on PC in 2015, but continues on the TV and the Sky Sports F1 iPad application.

Criticisms
It was reported that, on 18 March 2012, BSkyB chief executive Jeremy Darroch ordered a news story on a plan to sell a stake of F1's parent company and shake-up commercial deals published the previous day to be removed from the Sky News website, subject to a review. It was alleged that the move came after Sky Sports F1 executive producer Martin Turner complained that it had upset seven of the twelve Formula One teams ahead of the Australian Grand Prix. The story was republished the following day substantially unchanged except for the replacement of some sections quoting directly from confidential documents. Jeremy Darroch said that "the issue was about process" and that Sky's sports team at the grand prix were not "properly briefed" ahead of publication. When questioned whether the request for a review represented a commercial interference in Sky News's editorial independence, Darroch said Sky needed to have "proper rigour in terms of our processes in our business".

At the 2022 Mexico City Grand Prix, it was reported that Max Verstappen and Red Bull would boycott interviews from Sky Sports F1, following comments made by presenter Ted Kravitz, claiming Lewis Hamilton was "robbed" of the 2021 Formula One World Drivers' Championship after mistakenly proclaiming him an "eight-time World Champion". Christian Horner described his comments as “the straw that broke the camel’s back”. Red Bull ended their boycott of Sky Sports F1 ahead of the 2022 São Paulo Grand Prix.

See also
Speed Channel (defunct channel)

References

External links

Official Formula One

NBC Sports
Formula One mass media
Sky Sports
Sports television channels in the United Kingdom
Television channels and stations established in 2012
2012 establishments in the United Kingdom